Cryphaea is a genus of mosses, (Bryophyta), containing at least 26 accepted species.

Species
There have been 165 plant names of the rank of species that have been used for the genus Cryphaea, although only 26 are now accepted species names within modern nomenclature.

Cryphaea acuminata Hook. f. & Wilson
Cryphaea apiculata Schimp.
Cryphaea evanescens Müll. Hal.
Cryphaea exigua (Müll. Hal.) A. Jaeger
Cryphaea filiformis (Hedw.) Brid.
Cryphaea glomerata Schimp. ex Sull.
Cryphaea heteromalla (Hedw.) D. Mohr
Cryphaea hygrophila Müll. Hal.
Cryphaea jamesonii Taylor
Cryphaea lamyana (Mont.) Müll. Hal. (Multi-fruited river moss/multi-fruited cryphaea)
Cryphaea leucocolea (Mitt.) H. Rob.
Cryphaea nitens (Müll. Hal.) Schimp. ex Paris
Cryphaea orizabae Schimp.
Cryphaea ovalifolia (Müll. Hal.) A. Jaeger
Cryphaea patens Hornsch. ex Müll. Hal.
Cryphaea pilifera Mitt.
Cryphaea protensa Bruch & Schimp. ex Müll. Hal.
Cryphaea raddiana (Brid.) Hampe
Cryphaea ragazzii (Brizi) Broth.
Cryphaea rhacomitrioides Müll. Hal.
Cryphaea rutenbergii Müll. Hal.
Cryphaea schiedeana (Müll. Hal.) Mitt.
Cryphaea songpanensis Enroth & T.J. Kop.
Cryphaea tasmanica Mitt.
Cryphaea tenella (Schwägr.) Hornsch. ex Müll. Hal.

References

Moss genera
Hypnales